Xique-Xique is a municipality in the state of Bahia in the North-East region of Brazil. Its estimated population in 2020 was 46,523 inhabitants. It is situated on the right bank of São Francisco River and is a regional economic center. Xique-Xique takes its name from a cactus, Pilosocereus gounellei, common to the region.

The first exploratory expedition to the region was in 1545, and carried out by the administration of Tomé de Souza (1503–1579), the first governor-general of the Portuguese colony of Brazil. A fazenda, or large-scale plantation, was established Cabo da Ipueira in the 17th century by the Portuguese Theobaldo Miranda Pires de Carvalho. Before ending the seventeenth century a gold-mining group called the Sierra Assuruá settled in Belvedere Island created the 1st core population inhabited by Europeans.

See also
List of municipalities in Bahia

References

Municipalities in Bahia